Augiades is a genus of butterflies in the family Hesperiidae, in which it is placed in tribe Entheini.

Augiades has two species, Augiades crinisus and Augiades epimethea.

References

Natural History Museum Lepidoptera genus database

Eudaminae
Hesperiidae genera
Taxa named by Jacob Hübner